Cheimonophyllum is a genus of fungi in the family Cyphellaceae. The widely distributed genus contains three species.

References

Cyphellaceae
Agaricales genera
Taxa named by Rolf Singer